The Suchovy goose (Slovak: Suchovská hus) is a breed of domestic goose originating in Suchá nad Parnou in Slovakia. The Suchovy goose was selectively bred in the 1980s from locally present domestic geese.

They reach maturity at 310–320 days old. They lay around 14–16 eggs of weight .

Population
With respect to the small number (150 females and 75 males) of the population, the Suchovy goose is considered to be endangered breed.

References

See also
 List of goose breeds
 Animal breeds originating in Slovakia

Goose breeds originating in Slovakia
Goose breeds